The 1954 International cricket season was from April 1954 to August 1954.

Season overview

June

Pakistan in England

August

Canada in England

England in Netherlands

Pakistan vs Canada in England

England in Denmark

References

1954 in cricket